Daung Kyun, also known as Ross Island, is an island in the Mergui Archipelago, Burma.

Geography
Daung Kyun is part of the northern group of islands of the archipelago. It is located off the southeastern shore of Thayawthadangyi Kyun.

References

External links
Myanmar Ecotourism - Ministry of Hotels and Tourism
Mergui Archipelago Photos

Mergui Archipelago
Tanintharyi Region